Glyphostoma canfieldi is a species of sea snail, a marine gastropod mollusk in the family Clathurellidae.

Description
The shell grows to a length of 8 mm. The shell is narrowly shouldered. Numerous indistinct longitudinal plications fade out towards the lower part of the body whorl. There are about sixteen revolving ridges on the body whorl. The anal sinus is deep. The shell is yellowish white, without bands or with from one to three narrow brown bands.

Distribution
This species occurs in the Pacific Ocean along California, USA

References

canfieldi
Gastropods described in 1871